Novoaleshkino is a rural locality (a village) in Podlesnensky Selsoviet, Sterlitamaksky District, Bashkortostan, Russia. The population was 24 as of 2010. There are 3 streets.

Geography 
Novoaleshkino is located 31 km north of Sterlitamak (the district's administrative centre) by road. Solovyovka is the nearest rural locality.

References 

Rural localities in Sterlitamaksky District